The Amati Girls is a 2001 American drama film written and directed by Anne De Salvo. It stars  Cloris Leachman, Mercedes Ruehl, Dinah Manoff, Sean Young, Lily Knight, Lee Grant, and Edith Fields.

Premise
The film centers around an Italian American family of four sisters (Mercedes Ruehl, Dinah Manoff, Sean Young, and Lily Knight) who reside in Philadelphia. After their father's death, in trying to convince their mother (Cloris Leachman) that her life is still worth living, each sister grapples with her own ideas on love, faith, and ultimately, the meaning of life.

Cast
 Cloris Leachman as Dolly Amati
 Mercedes Ruehl as Grace Amati
 Dinah Manoff as Denise Amati
 Sean Young as Christine Amati
 Lily Knight as Dolores Amati
 Lee Grant as Aunt Splendora
 Edith Fields as Aunt Loretta
 Cassie Cole as Carla
 Marissa Leigh as Laura
 Sam McMurray as Brian
 Joe Greco as Uncle Frankie
 Matt Winston as Johnny Barlotta
 Mary Hershberger as Kevin
 Anne De Salvo as Cathy
 Sal Viscuso as Father Dedice
 Anna Berger as Stella
 John Capodice as Danny
 Robert Picardo as Grace's Doctor
 Frederic Tucker as Stage Manager (Credited as Fred Tucker)
 Carol Ann Susi as Ticket Seller
 Jay Acovone as Mr. Moltianni
 Don Marino as Sam
 Kivi Rogers as Mike
 Asher Gold as Peter
 Mark Harmon as Lawrence
 Kyle Sabihy as Joey
 Jessica Sara as Nancy
 Jamey Sheridan as Paul
 Paul Sorvino as Joe
 Niki Harris as Flight Attendant
 Maria Cina as Rockie's Girl
 Larrisa Joy as Italian Class Student
 Doug Spinuzza as Armand
 Michelle Joyner as Moviegoer
 Anthony Pontrello as Nick the Bartender

Cameo/uncredited cast
 Sean Huze as Concert Goer

Reception
The Amati Girls holds a 46% approval rating on Rotten Tomatoes based on 13 reviews, with an average score of 4.39/10. Metacritic reports a score of 29 out of 100 based on 17 critics, indicating "generally unfavorable reviews".

References

External links
 
 

2001 films
2001 drama films
American drama films
Films set in Philadelphia
American independent films
2001 independent films
2000s English-language films
2000s American films
2001 directorial debut films